Daniela Borruso-Sereftug (born 9 December 1959), better known by the stage name Daniela Simmons (sometimes written Simons), is a singer/songwriter/musician who represented Switzerland at the Eurovision Song Contest 1986 in Bergen with the song Pas pour moi. The song finished second behind Belgium's entry. Simmons had made previous attempts to represent Switzerland. In 1983, she came last in the national selection with Dis moi tout but took second place in 1985 with Repars à zéro. Simmons made one further Eurovision attempt in 1991 but finished second in the national heat with Come finirà?.

References

External links 
Official webpage

Living people
Eurovision Song Contest entrants for Switzerland
Eurovision Song Contest entrants of 1986
Swiss women singers
20th-century Swiss musicians
20th-century women singers
1959 births